Mikulovice is a market town in Znojmo District in the South Moravian Region of the Czech Republic. It has about 600 inhabitants.

Notable people
Emanuel Krescenc Liška (1852–1903), painter and illustrator
Růžena Svobodová (1868–1920), writer

References

Populated places in Znojmo District
Market towns in the Czech Republic